See also François Tristan l'Hermite

Tristan l'Hermite (died c. 1478) was a French political and military figure of the late Middle Ages. He was born in Flanders near the beginning of the century.

He was provost of the marshals of the King's household under Louis XI of France, which gave him enormous power in the intrigues and plots that characterized that king's 22-year reign.

The mystique surrounding his name caused the 17th-century French poet and playwright François l'Hermite to take his name as a pseudonym.

He appears as a figure in Victor Hugo's Notre-Dame de Paris, in Walter Scott's Quentin Durward, in the Justin Huntly McCarthy play If I Were King, and in the operetta made from the play, Rudolf Friml's The Vagabond King. He is also a character, as a young man still in the service of Arthur III of Brittany, in Juliette Benzoni's "Catherine" novel, Les Routes incertaines.

L'Hermite, Tristan
L'Hermite, Tristan
L'Hermite, Tristan